Monroe Regional Airport may refer to:

 Monroe Regional Airport (Louisiana) serving Monroe, Louisiana, United States (FAA/IATA: MLU)
 Charlotte-Monroe Executive Airport, formerly Monroe Regional Airport, serving Monroe, North Carolina, United States (FAA: EQY)
 Monroe City Regional Airport serving Monroe, Missouri, United States (FAA: K52)

See also
 Monroe Airport (disambiguation)
 Monroe County Airport (disambiguation)